Milton Phillip Semer (March 5, 1919 – July 27, 2016) was an American lawyer.

Early life and education

Career
He was General Counsel for the U.S. Housing and Home Finance Agency from 1961 to 1966.

Semer oversaw the campaign of Democratic Party politician Edmund S. Muskie.  His work on the 1972 Edmund Muskie for President Committee landed him on the master list of Nixon's political opponents.

He was lawyer for Fernand St. Germain, Democratic U.S. Representative from Rhode Island, during an ethics investigation; St. Germain was cleared of all charges in 1987. Semer died in July 2016 at the age of 97.

References

Associated Press (April 13, 1987). "House Ethics Panel To Clear St. Germain of Abusing Office". The New York Times.

1919 births
2016 deaths
American lawyers
Kennedy administration personnel
Lawyers who have represented the United States government
Lyndon B. Johnson administration personnel
Officials of former United States federal executive departments